Zygmunt Choreń (born 1941) is a Polish naval architect and the proprietor of the naval architectural firm Choreń Design and Consulting. He is a graduate of the Gdańsk University of Technology and the Leningrad Ship-Building Institute.

He was a crewmember in the Whitbread Round The World Race 1973-74 on the boat Otago.

List of ships

List ships that have been designed or redesigned by Choreń:
1980 – STS Pogoria
1982 – Dar Młodzieży
1982 – ORP Iskra II (1982)
1984 – STV Kaliakra
1985 – RV Oceania
1987 – Druzhba
1987 – STS Mir
1988 – Alexander von Humboldt
1989 – Khersones
1989 – Pallada
1991 – Nadezhda
1991 – STS Fryderyk Chopin
1991 – STS Kaisei
1995 – Estelle
2000 – SV Royal Clipper
2002 – Mephisto
2008 – Petit Prince
2010 – Running On Waves
2015 – STS Lê Quý Dôn
2017 – El-Mellah
2017 – Golden Horizon

See also

Naval architecture

References

Polish yacht designers
Naval architects
1941 births
Living people
Gdańsk University of Technology alumni
Volvo Ocean Race sailors
Polish designers